Toilet cleaners are chemical solutions designed specifically for cleaning a toilet bowl, usually in conjunction with a toilet brush.

Usage
Toilet cleaner is sprayed around the rim and into the bowl of the toilet prior to the use of the toilet brush. The toilet brush is used to scrub the toilet, removing stubborn stains and biological debris. In recent times, automatic toilet bowl cleaners that clip onto the rim of the toilet and clean with every flush have also become prevalent.

Toilet cleaners tend to be toxic, as they contain disinfectants which can cause skin irritations.  "Heavy duty" formulations often include hydrochloric acid (HCl) in varying amounts, necessitating care in handling and storage, as well as adequate ventilation while in use.

Commercial brands
Domestos
Harpic
Toilet Duck
Lysol
Poo-Pourri

See also 

 Pumice stone, may be used for cleaning a hard water line

References

External links 
 Toilet cleaner poison information from drugs.com

Cleaning products
Toilets